The 2018–19 season was the 84th season in La Liga played by RCD Espanyol, a Spanish football club based in Barcelona, Catalonia. It covers a period from 1 July 2018 to 30 June 2019.

First team squad

Transfers

In 

 Total Spending: €18,000,000

Out 

 Total Income: €25,000,000

Net Income:  €7,000,000

Pre-season and friendlies

Competitions

La Liga

Results summary

Result round by round

Matches

Copa del Rey

Round of 32

Round of 16

Quarter-finals

Statistics

Appearances and goals
Last updated on 18 May 2019.

|-
! colspan=14 style=background:#dcdcdc; text-align:center|Goalkeepers

|-
! colspan=14 style=background:#dcdcdc; text-align:center|Defenders

|-
! colspan=14 style=background:#dcdcdc; text-align:center|Midfielders

|-
! colspan=14 style=background:#dcdcdc; text-align:center|Forwards

|-
! colspan=14 style=background:#dcdcdc; text-align:center| Players who have made an appearance or had a squad number this season but have left the club

|}

References

External links 

RCD Espanyol seasons
Espanyol
Espanyol